Beata Mikołajczyk (born 15 October 1985) is a Polish sprint canoer. She competed at the 2008, 2012 and 2016 Olympics, in two events for each games; she won one silver and two bronze medals and placed fourth two times.

Career
Mikołajczyk took up canoeing in 1996 in her native Bydgoszcz. She won the silver medal in K-2 500 m event at the 2008 Summer Olympics in Beijing with Aneta Pastuszka-Konieczna. She won the bronze medal in K-2 500 m event at the 2012 Summer Olympics in London with Karolina Naja. She also won a gold in the K-2 1000 m event at the 2009 ICF Canoe Sprint World Championships in Dartmouth.

In June 2015, she competed in the inaugural European Games for Poland in canoe sprint, more specifically, Women's K-4 500m with Ewelina Wojnarowska, Edyta Dzieniszewska, and Karolina Naja. She earned a bronze medal.

Awards
For her sport achievements, she received:
  Golden Cross of Merit in 2008.
   Knight's Cross Order of Polonia Restituta in 2013.

References

External links

 
 
 

1985 births
Living people
Canoeists at the 2008 Summer Olympics
Canoeists at the 2012 Summer Olympics
Canoeists at the 2016 Summer Olympics
Olympic canoeists of Poland
Olympic silver medalists for Poland
Sportspeople from Bydgoszcz
Polish female canoeists
Olympic medalists in canoeing
Recipients of the Gold Cross of Merit (Poland)
Recipients of the Order of Polonia Restituta
Olympic bronze medalists for Poland
ICF Canoe Sprint World Championships medalists in kayak
Medalists at the 2012 Summer Olympics
Medalists at the 2008 Summer Olympics
Medalists at the 2016 Summer Olympics
European Games medalists in canoeing
Canoeists at the 2015 European Games
European Games bronze medalists for Poland